István Tóth (born 1951) is a Hungarian wrestler. He was born in Szolnok. He won an Olympic silver medal in Greco-Roman wrestling in 1980. He won a gold medal at the 1979 and 1981 World Wrestling Championships.

References

External links

1951 births
Living people
Olympic wrestlers of Hungary
Wrestlers at the 1980 Summer Olympics
Hungarian male sport wrestlers
Olympic silver medalists for Hungary
Olympic medalists in wrestling
Medalists at the 1980 Summer Olympics
People from Szolnok
Sportspeople from Jász-Nagykun-Szolnok County
20th-century Hungarian people